Katie Long (born 13 May 1988) is a field hockey forward player from England.

References

External links
GB Hockey

1986 births
Living people
English female field hockey players
Place of birth missing (living people)
Loughborough Students field hockey players
21st-century English women